This is a list of rivers of Antarctica. Although they are variously named rivers, creeks or streams, those listed are technically all meltwater streams.

Table

References

Rivers
Antarctica